The surname Knott has several origins. The English-language surname is derived from the Middle English personal name Knut, a cognate of the Old Norse personal name Knútr, which is in turn derived from knútr ("knot"). The surname Knott is also a variant spelling of the German-language surname Knoth, which is derived from the Middle High German knode, knote ("knot").

People
 Knott family (lighthouse keepers)
 Alan Knott (born 1946), English cricketer
 Andrew Knott (born 1979), English actor
 Annie M. Knott (1850–1941), prominent Scottish-born Christian Scientist
 Bert Knott (1914–1986), English footballer
 Bill Knott (politician) (1921–2013), Australian politician
 Bill Knott (poet) (born 1940), American poet
 Bill Knott (footballer) (active in 1922), footballer from New Zealand
 Blanche Knott, American author
 Cara Knott (1966–1986), American student murdered by a law enforcement officer
 Cargill Gilston Knott (1856–1922), Scottish physicist, mathematician and seismologist
 Charles Knott (1914–2003), English cricketer
 Charles Harold Knott, known as John Knott, (1901–1988), English cricketer
 Dan Knott (1879–1959), Canadian labour activist and politician
 Darren Knott, British disc jockey and record producer
 Edward Knott (1582–1656), English Jesuit controversialist
 Eleanor Knott MRIA (1886–1975),  an Irish scholar, academic and lexicographer
 Eric Knott (born 1974), American baseballer
 Francis Knott, British athlete during the 1908 Summer Olympics
 Freddie Knott (1891–1972), English cricketer
 Frederick Knott (1916–2002), English playwright
 George Knott (1910–2001), Australian athlete and politician
 Ian Knott, English rugby league footballer who played in the 1990s and 2000s
 J. Proctor Knott (1830–1911), Governor of Kentucky
 Jack Knott (1907–1981), American baseballer
 Sir James Knott, 1st Baronet (1855–1934), English shipping magnate and politician
 James Knott (born 1975), English cricketer, the son of Alan Knott
 John Knott (disambiguation), multiple people
 Jon Knott (born 1978), American baseballer
 Lydia Knott (1866–1955), American actress of the silent era
 Kathleen Knott (born 1987), Australian netball player
 Nick Knott (1920–1987), Canadian ice hockey player
 Michael Knott, American singer-songwriter
 Percy Knott, English footballer in the 1920s
 Peter Knott (1956–2015), Australian politician
 Ralph Knott (1878–1929), British architect
 Sidney Knott (1933–2020), South African cricketer
 Stuart R. Knott (1859–1943), the fourth president of Kansas City Southern Railway
 Walter Knott (1889–1981), American farmer who created the Knott's Berry Farm amusement park

See also:
 Knotts, a surname
 Nott (disambiguation)

English-language surnames